Universal Vare Charter School, formerly the Edwin H. Vare Junior High School, is a historic junior high school building located in the Wilson Park neighborhood of Philadelphia, Pennsylvania. It is currently a charter school run by Universal Family of Schools. The building was designed by Irwin T. Catharine and built in 1922–1924. It is a three-story, 17 bay, brick building on a raised basement in the Colonial Revival-style. It is in the shape of a shallow "W." It features an entrance pavilions with arched openings, pilasters, and a brick parapet.

The building was added to the National Register of Historic Places in 1988.

References

External links

School buildings on the National Register of Historic Places in Philadelphia
Colonial Revival architecture in Pennsylvania
School buildings completed in 1924
Charter schools in Pennsylvania
South Philadelphia
Public middle schools in Pennsylvania